Propylea is a small genus of lady beetles, including one widespread Old World species that is invasive in North America, Propylea quatuordecimpunctata.

Species
 Propylea japonica (Thunberg, 1781)
 Propylea luteopustulata (Mulsant, 1850)
 Propylea dissecta Mulsant, 1846
 Propylea quatuordecimpunctata (Linnéaus, 1758)

Gallery

References

External links
 
 

Coccinellidae genera
Taxa named by Étienne Mulsant